Unión Tarija is a Bolivian football team playing at Tarija Primera A, the 2nd division regional league. It is based in Tarija.  Their home stadium is Estadio IV Centenário. The team played in the Liga de Fútbol Profesional Boliviano between 1999 and 2006.

History 
The club was founded on April 8, 1980, as the Club Unión Central.

National honours 
First Division – Professional Era: 0
Copa Simón Bolivar: 1
1998

References 

Union Central
Association football clubs established in 1980
1980 establishments in Bolivia